Jasionka may refer to the following places in Poland:
 Rzeszów-Jasionka Airport
Jasionka, Lesser Poland Voivodeship (south Poland)
Jasionka, Łódź Voivodeship (central Poland)
Jasionka, Lublin Voivodeship (east Poland)
Jasionka, Masovian Voivodeship (east-central Poland)
Jasionka, Pomeranian Voivodeship (north Poland)
Jasionka, Krosno County in Subcarpathian Voivodeship (south-east Poland)
Jasionka, Rzeszów County in Subcarpathian Voivodeship (south-east Poland)

See also